All Saints’ Church, Wingerworth is a Grade I listed parish church in the Church of England in Wingerworth, Derbyshire.

History
The church dates from the 12th century with elements from the 13th, 14th and 15th centuries. The church was restored between 1903 and 1905 at a cost of £370 (equivalent to £ in )and was rededicated by the Bishop of Southwell Sir Edwyn Hoskyns, 12th Baronet on 27 September 1905. A new east window by Clayton and Bell was added in memory of Hon. Adelaide Augusta Wilhelmina Hunloke. The font was replaced and the nave and aisles were re-pewed.

More recently it was extended between 1963 and 1964 by the architects Naylor, Sale and Widdows.

Organ
 
The organ was by Brindley & Foster and installed in 1867.  A specification of the organ can be found on the National Pipe Organ Register. In 2006 it was replaced by a new organ by Henry Groves & Son.

See also
Grade I listed churches in Derbyshire
Grade I listed buildings in Derbyshire
Listed buildings in Wingerworth

References

Church of England church buildings in Derbyshire
Grade I listed churches in Derbyshire